The Beckhampton Avenue was a curving prehistoric avenue of stones that ran broadly south west from Avebury towards The Longstones at Beckhampton in the English county of Wiltshire. It probably dates to the late Neolithic and early Bronze Age.

Only one stone, known as Adam, remains standing and even in William Stukeley's time (early 18th century) there was little evidence on the surface of the avenue. The other stones were probably broken up and sold by local landowners in the post-medieval era. Excavations by the University of Southampton in 2000, however, revealed the parallel rows of holes that held the stones. 120 m of the avenue was uncovered and indicated that the avenue consisted of a double row of stones placed at 15 m intervals in a similar pattern to those at Kennet Avenue.

Stukeley's theory was that the two avenues were part of a giant 'snake' winding across the landscape with its head at The Sanctuary and also incorporating the Avebury monument.

The avenue may have originally extended further past the Longstones, with Adam being part of the 'cove' or standing stone arrangement sited along its course. Eve is a known part of the avenue leading back to the western gateway of the henge, which included what is now the village high street.

Before the avenue was built, the site was host to an earlier Neolithic causewayed enclosure.

References

Ancient trackways in England
History of Wiltshire
Stone Age sites in England
Archaeological sites in Wiltshire
Protected areas of Wiltshire
Causewayed enclosures
Bronze Age sites in Wiltshire